The First Republic was the republican government of Nigeria between 1963 and 1966 governed by the first republican constitution. The country's government was based on a federal form of the Westminster system. The period between 1 October 1960, when the country gained its independence and 15 January 1966, when the first military coup d’état took place, is also generally referred to as the First Republic. The first Republic of Nigeria was ruled by different leaders representing their regions as premiers in a federation during this period. Leaders include Ahmadu Bello Northern Nigeria 1959–1966, Obafemi Awolowo Western Nigeria 1959–1960, Samuel Akintola Western Nigeria 1960–1966, Michael Okpara Eastern Nigeria 1960–1966, and Dennis Osadebay Mid-Western Nigeria 1964–1966.

Founded (1963)
Although Nigeria gained independence from the United Kingdom on 1 October 1960, the nation retained the British monarch, Elizabeth II, as titular head of state until the adoption of a new constitution in 1963 declaring the nation a republic. The Westminster system of government was retained, and thus the President's powers were generally ceremonial.

The name "Nigeria" is derived from the word "Niger" – the name of the river that constitutes the most remarkable geographical feature of the country. The country gained independence from the British government on 1 October 1960, and became a republic in 1963. The journey to independence started with some constitutional developments in Nigeria. These constitutional developments saw the country attaining self-rule in some quarters in 1957 and total independence on 1 October 1960.

President

Note: Nnamdi Azikiwe resigned from NCNC to become the First Governor-General of Nigeria from 16 November 1960 – 30 September 1963.

Prime minister
Alhaji Sir Abubakar Tafawa Balewa of the Northern People's Congress was the only Prime Minister during the period of the First Republic.

Political parties
Action Group (AG)
Borno Youth Movement (BYM)
Democratic Party of Nigeria and Cameroon (DPNC)
Dynamic Party (DP)
Igala Union (IU)
Igbira Tribal Union (ITU)
Midwest Democratic Front (MDF)
National Council of Nigeria and the Cameroons/National Convention of Nigerian Citizens (NCNC)
National Independence Party  (NIP)
Niger Delta Congress (NDC)
Nigerian National Democratic Party (NNDP)
Northern Elements Progressive Union (NEPU)
Northern People's Congress (NPC)
Northern Progressive Front (NPF)
Republican Party (RP)
United Middle Belt Congress (UMBC)
United National Independence Party (UNIP)
Zamfara Commoners Party (ZCP)

Politics
The country was split into three geopolitical regions—Western Region, Eastern Region and Northern Region—and its political parties took on the identities and ideologies of each region. The Northern People's Congress (NPC) represented the interests of the predominantly Hausa/Fulani Northern Region, the National Council of Nigeria and the Cameroons (NCNC)] (later renamed to "National Council of Nigerian Citizens") represented the predominantly Igbo Eastern Region, and the Action Group (AG) dominated the Yoruba Western Region. The NPC took control of the federal parliament, and formed a coalition government with the NCNC. The National Independence Party (NIP) formed by Professor Eyo Ita became the second political party in the old Eastern Region.  Ahmadu Bello, the Sardauna of Sokoto, leader of the NPC, was poised to become the Prime Minister, but instead he chose to become the Premier of the Northern Region, and supported his deputy Tafawa Balewa's candidacy for Prime Minister. This raised suspicions amongst the southern politicians, who resented the idea of a federal government controlled by a regional leader through his designated proxy. In the end, Tafawa Balewa of NPC was named Prime Minister and Head of Government, and Nnamdi Azikiwe of NCNC was named President.

At Nigeria's independence, the Northern Region gained more seats in parliament than both Eastern and Western regions combined—this would cement Northern dominance in Nigerian politics for years to come. Resentment amongst southern politicians precipitated into political chaos in the country. Obafemi Awolowo, Premier of Western Region, was accused of attempting to overthrow the government. This followed a period of conflict between the AG regional government and the central government. In spite of the flimsiness of the evidence presented by the government's prosecutors, he was convicted. With incarceration of Awolowo, Samuel Akintola took over as the Premier of Western Region. Because Akintola was an ally of Ahmadu Bello, the undisputed strong man of Nigeria, Akintola was criticized as being a tool of the North.  As premier of the West, Akintola presided over the most chaotic era in Western Region—one which earned it the nickname "the Wild-Wild West". However, as late as Thursday, 13 January 1966, Balewa had announced that the federal government was not going to intervene in the West.  However, the very next day, Akintola, premier of the West met with his ally Ahmadu Bello, the Sardauna of Sokoto, premier of the North and party boss of NPC party to which Balewa belonged.  At the same time a top-level security conference in Lagos was taking place which was attended by most of the country's senior army officiers.  All of this activity created rumors that the Balewa government would be forced to crack down on lawlessness in the West using military might.

Notable politicians

S.A. Ajayi returned to Kabba Province and joined the Northern People's Congress, where he later rose to become the vice president of the party in Kabba Province. In 1955, he was elected councillor in the Kabba Native Administration and a year later, he won a seat in the Northern House of Assembly, and became a member of the regional executive council as minister of state for forestry affairs. He was appointed acting minister for education in 1963, in the absence of Isa Kaita. During his time in the Northern House of Assembly, he was appointed parliamentary secretary to the Premier of Northern Nigeria, Ahmadu Bello from 1957 to 1960. He was among the delegate that negotiated Nigerian Independence at the Lancaster House Conferences in London and led the Northern Nigeria Delegation to London for the Negotiation and Launching of VC-10 Nigeria Airways. He was a member of Nigeria Economic Mission to West Germany and was a minister till their government was overthrown by the military coup on January 15, 1966. During Shehu Shagari's administration, he was appointed to the first board of directors of National Insurance Corporation of Nigeria (NICON).

The coup

The political unrest during the mid-1960s culminated into Nigeria's first military coup d'état. On 15 January 1966, Major Chukwuma Kaduna Nzeogwu and his fellow rebel soldiers (most of who were of southern extraction) and were led by Major Emmanuel Ifeajuna of the Nigerian Army, executed a bloody takeover of all institutions of government. Prime Minister Tafawa Balewa, was assassinated along with the premier of Northern Nigeria, strong-man Ahmadu Bello the Sardauna of Sokoto, Samuel Akintola, premier of the West and Festus Okotie-Eboh, the Finance Minister.   . It is not clear whether President Azikiwe's life was spared because he was out of the country at the time, or whether he had been informed about the impending coup and was out of the country so that his life could be spared. Major-General Johnson Aguiyi-Ironsi took control as the first Head of the Federal Military Government of Nigeria on January 16, 1966.

Civil war and beyond: 1966–79
The republic would be torn by the secession of Biafra and the ensuing civil war from 1966 to 1970. After the end of the war, the nation re-unified and military rule continued for another nine years, implementing Nationalisation of foreign businesses. Eventually, elections were held in 1979 leading the way to the Nigerian Second Republic.

See also
 Nigerian Civil War
 Nigerian Second Republic (1979–83)
 Nigerian Third Republic (1993)
 Nigerian Fourth Republic (1999–present)

References

External links
 THE FIRST REPUBLIC
 Nigeria - US State Department Profile
 The History of Nigeria
 Media Accountability and Democracy in Nigeria
 The inside story of Nigeria's first military coup (1)

History of Nigeria
1960s in Nigeria
Republic of Nigeria 01
Nigeria 01
Politics of Nigeria
1963 establishments in Nigeria
1966 disestablishments in Nigeria
1963 in Nigeria
1964 in Nigeria
1965 in Nigeria
1966 in Nigeria